The 1966–67 Football League season was Birmingham City Football Club's 64th in the Football League and their 26th in the Second Division. They finished in tenth position in the 22-team division. They entered the 1966–67 FA Cup in the third round proper and lost to Tottenham Hotspur in the sixth round after a replay. They entered at the second round of the League Cup and reached the semi-final, in which they lost heavily to Queens Park Rangers over two legs.

Twenty-three players made at least one appearance in nationally organised first-team competition, and there were thirteen different goalscorers. Goalkeeper Jim Herriot played in all 55 first-team matches over the season; among outfield players, half-back Malcolm Beard and forward Geoff Vowden missed only one. Vowden finished as leading goalscorer with 21 goals, of which 16 came in league competition.

Football League Second Division

League table (part)

FA Cup

League Cup

Appearances and goals

Numbers in parentheses denote appearances as substitute.
Players with name struck through and marked  left the club during the playing season.

See also
Birmingham City F.C. seasons

References
General
 
 
 Source for match dates and results: 
 Source for lineups, appearances, goalscorers and attendances: Matthews (2010), Complete Record, pp. 368–69.
 Source for kit: "Birmingham City". Historical Football Kits. Retrieved 22 May 2018.

Specific

Birmingham City F.C. seasons
Birmingham City